Listed below are the dates and results for the 1994 FIFA World Cup qualification rounds for the African zone (CAF). For an overview of the qualification rounds, see the article 1994 FIFA World Cup qualification.

A total of 40 CAF teams entered the competition. However, Burkina Faso, Malawi, São Tomé and Príncipe and Sierra Leone all withdrew before the draw was made. The African Zone was allocated three places (out of 24) in the final tournament.

Format
There would be two rounds of play:
First Round: The 36 teams were divided into 9 groups of 4 teams each. The teams would play against each other on a home-and-away basis. The group winners would advance to the Second Round.
Second Round: The 9 teams were divided into 3 groups of 3 teams each. The teams would play against each other on a home-and-away basis. The group winners would qualify.

First round

Group A

Algeria advanced to the Second Round.

Group B

Cameroon advanced to the Second Round. Liberia withdrew after playing one match, its result was annulled

Group C

Zimbabwe advanced to the Second Round.

Group D

Nigeria advanced to the Second Round.

Group E

Ivory Coast advanced to the Second Round.

Group F

Morocco advanced to the Second Round.

Group G

Senegal advanced to the Second Round.

Group H

Zambia advanced to the Second Round.

Group I

Guinea advanced to the Second Round.

Second round

Group A

Nigeria qualified for the World Cup.

Group B

Morocco qualified for the World Cup.

Group C

Cameroon qualified for the World Cup.

Qualified teams
The following three teams from CAF qualified for the final tournament.

1 Bold indicates champions for that year. Italic indicates hosts for that year.

Goalscorers

8 goals

 Rashidi Yekini

6 goals

 Agent Sawu

5 goals

 Abdelhafid Tasfaout
 Abdoulaye Traoré
 Mohammed Chaouch

4 goals

 Alphonse Tchami
 Hossam Hassan
 Guy Roger Nzamba
 Souleyman Sané
 Kalusha Bwalya

3 goals

 Joël Tiéhi
 Titi Camara
 Abdelmajid Bouyboud
 Youssef Fertout
 Ayedi Hamrouni
 Kelvin Mutale

2 goals

 Mourad Meziane
 François Omam-Biyik
 Omar Ben Salah
 Ahmed El-Kass
 Fodé Camara
 Jean-Paul
 Harry Elyse Randrianaivo
 Rachid Daoudi
 Moussa Yahaya
 Daniel Amokachi
 Finidi George
 Moussa Badiane
 Alagame Seck
 Taoufik Herichi
 Mohamed Ali Mahjoubi
 Faouzi Rouissi
 Lotfi Rouissi
 Moses Chikwalakwala
 Adam Ndlovu
 Peter Ndlovu

1 goal

 Mohamed Brahimi
 Antonio Neto
 José Neves
 Paulão
 Youssouf Arouna
 Euloge Sacramento
 Comlan Lambert Sossa
 Itumeleng Duiker
 Amani Habimana
 Albert Niyonkuru
 Olivier Djappa
 Ernest Ebongué
 David Embé
 Jacob Ewane
 Jean-Pierre Fiala
 Emmanuel Maboang
 Joseph Mbarga
 Emmanuel Tiki
 Lucien Kassi-Kouadio
 Ahmed Ouattara
 Yasser Ezzat
 Ayman Mansour
 Hany Ramzy
 Milyon Beguashaw
 Mengitsu Hussein
 Asnake Tenker
 François Amégasse
 Pierre Aubameyang
 Valery Ondo
 Charles Akonnor
 Kwame Ayew
 Abedi Pele
 Tony Yeboah
 Sékou Dramé
 Souleymane Oularé
 Mohamed Sylla
 Henry Motego
 Patrick Nachok
 Etienne Rado Rasoanaivo
 Fidy Rasoanaivo
 Frederic Remi
 Lahcen Abrami
 Tahar El Khalej
 Abdeslam Laghrissi
 Mohammed Lashaf
 Abdelkabir Mezziane
 Mohamed Samadi
 Arnaldo Owanga
 Antonio Sardina
 Henrique Tembe
 Soumaila Yattaga
 Edema Fuludu
 Jay-Jay Okocha
 Thomson Oliha
 Richard Daddy Owubokiri
 Samson Siasia
 Mamadou Diarra
 Mamadou Diallo
 Papa Yakhya Lette
 Harold Legodi
 Phil Masinga
 Turbie Terblanche
 Salissou Ali
 Tadjou Salou
 Jameleddine Limam
 Adel Sellimi
 Ziad Tlemçani
 Okita Katschi
 Johnson Bwalya
 Wisdom Mumba Chansa
 Elijah Litana
 Kenneth Malitoli
 Gibby Mbasela
 Charly Musonda
 Timothy Mwitwa
 Kenan Simambe
 Henry McKop

External links
World Cup 1994 Qualifying – RSSSF

 
CAF
FIFA World Cup qualification (CAF)